Sermide e Felonica (Lower Mantovano and Ferrarese) is a comune in the Province of Mantua. It was created in 2017 after the merger of Sermide and Felonica.

References

External links
Official website

Cities and towns in Lombardy